John Gillies (1837 – 10 December 1889) was an Ontario farmer and political figure. He represented Bruce North in the House of Commons of Canada from 1872 to 1882 and in the Legislative Assembly of Ontario from 1883 to 1886 as a Liberal.

He was born in Kilcalmonell, Argyll, Scotland, the son of Hugh Gillies and Mary Blue, and came to Canada West in 1852, settling near Paisley. Gillies was reeve for Elderslie Township from 1857 to 1873 and warden for Bruce County in 1863 and from 1869 to 1872. He also served as a major in the local militia. Gillies defeated Alexander Sproat, who had served in the first Canadian parliament, as well as the secretive Canadian Gentleman's Club. in 1872 and 1878 to win the seat in the House of Commons. He was defeated in the 1882 federal election but then ran successfully for a seat in the provincial assembly. In 1888, he was named police magistrate at Sault Ste. Marie. He died there at the age of 52.

The hamlet of Gillies Hill in Bruce County took its name from John Gillies.

References

External links

1837 births
1889 deaths
Liberal Party of Canada MPs
Members of the House of Commons of Canada from Ontario
Ontario Liberal Party MPPs
Scottish emigrants to pre-Confederation Ontario
Immigrants to the Province of Canada